Julie Sutton may refer to:

Julie Sutton (mayor) (born 1937), Australian politician, mayor of Warringah
Julie Sutton (curler), Canadian curler